Chondronectin is a cartilage matrix protein that specifically mediates the attachment of chondrocytes to type II collagen.

References

Extracellular matrix proteins